Madhurawada is a major business and residential area of Visakhapatnam in the state of Andhra Pradesh. It is located on the Visakhapatnam-Vizianagaram stretch of National Highway 16 around 16 km from the city center of Visakhapatnam.

This region is famous for its Visakhapatnam IT Special Economic Zone, located in the proposed digitally-enabled smart urban city. Among the state Tourism Department's six major projects announced in 2018, planning has begun on a Special Tourism Zone with 250 acres for hotels, an amusement park, and oceanarium.

This suburb consists of many popular tourist sites, such as Pothinamallayya Palem, Chandrampalem, Mithilapuri VUDA colony, Revallapalem, Ganeshnagar, and Port colony.

History
Madhurawada was the site of a pre-historic culture during the Neolithic period. As reported by an Andhra University professor, "on the Visakhapatnam coast the Neolithic folk settled on the red sediments, and their cultural remains were subsequently covered by the aeolian sands as revealed by studies at Ramayogi Agraharam, Paradesipalem, Madhurawada, Marikavalasa, and Lankelapalem."

Commerce
Madhurawada is a major commercial center with shopping spaces including a DMart, Reliance Trends and Reliance Digital for retail and a Metro Cash & Carry for wholesale purchases. Srikanya Cinepolis, STBL Cine World, and Durga Theatre are the major movie theaters.

Transport

APSRTC routes
The Madhurawada Bus Depot is situated in the neighborhood of Mithilapuri VUDA colony. It is well connected to the state's major towns, such as Kurnool, Kadapa, Srisailam, Bhimavaram, Amalapuram, and Tirupati. APSRTC (25-Series) provides bus services to the other parts of the city.

See also 

 Fintech Valley Vizag
 Visakhapatnam

References

External links

Neighbourhoods in Visakhapatnam